The Lebanese housing bubble refers to an economic bubble affecting almost all of the Lebanese real estate sector, whereby property prices have risen exponentially since 2005 (an average 5-fold increase as of February 2010), while the GDP has risen only around 52% during that same period.

Current status of the bubble 
The Lebanese GDP per capita is around US$13,000 (after taxes) while the Lebanese working abroad make on average around $30,000 /year (after taxes). A decent housing situation far away from Beirut can cost around $150,000, a decent housing in the suburbs of Beirut can easily cost 4 times that amount, while decent housing in the Beirut Central District could cost millions. Since home prices are rising constantly, many Lebanese and other investors are buying (through a mortgage) houses in order to resell them later (to other potential investors) at inflated prices. This strategy, as well as other deceptive strategies by the real estate agents left many Lebanese, both inside and outside Lebanon, unable to buy property in Lebanon anymore. Additionally, the inflated home prices are leading to an increase in rental prices, further increasing inflation and decreasing the real income of the Lebanese living in Lebanon. Other Lebanese who are end-buyers (e.g. not thinking of reselling their home) are committing to long term and risky loans in order to repay their mortgage. Since the banks only give 60% of the price of the house, the banking system in Lebanon can sustain a decrease of 40% of home prices in case of a bubble burst, this will increase the effect of the bubble burst on the buyer, as sometimes the 40% can constitute one's life savings (as well as his family's).

House prices in decent areas have increased so much that they're currently much more than in luxurious cities in countries enjoying political stability and a much higher GDP per capita. Although the governor of the Banque du Liban claims that the demand is 'real', there does not seem to be a real logic behind the continuous sharp increase in home prices.

Counter argument 

Despite slowing local demand, high real estate prices are sustained for several reasons.
First, Lebanon's real estate sector faces currently real demand and not much speculative
demand. In fact, Lebanese residents account for the largest portion of demand for property.
Hence, Lebanon's real estate sector does not encompass high-risk associated with
speculative pressure that has been witnessed in other countries during the global financial
crisis. This explains the stickiness in property prices, which did not adjust downward, given
the continued momentum in demand by end-users despite the slowing overall real estate
market. Second, the scarcity of land and mounting construction of luxurious residences
exert upward pressure on property prices. Third, the increase in real estate demand by
displaced Syrian nationals is playing an important role in compensating for reduced local
demand, hence contributing to further stickiness in real estate prices.
In order to understand the discrepancy in trend evolution of real estate demand, it is
important to study the evolution of average value per real estate transaction. This value
has gradually increased over the period 2008–2013. The highest increment was recorded
in Metn region, where the average value increased by 107.3% over the six-year period
to reach US$213,584 in 2013. Concurrently, the average value per transaction in Beirut
region rose by 69.5% in the same reporting period reaching US$499,948 in 2013. Baabda
and Kesserwan also witnessed rises in average value per real estate transactions, which
reached US$121,913 and US$144,711 respectively. However, while the average selling
price per real estate transaction continued to rise in most regions during 2014, Metn and
Kesserwan regions witnessed year-on-year declines in average value per transaction each
reaching US$194,807 and US$127,614 in 2014. This is attributed to a combination of
factors including price adjustment to falling demand and the shift towards smaller-sized
property, which lowers the value per transaction.

Lack of data 
A speculative bubble reflects a situation in which asset prices are consistently trading at considerably higher values than intrinsic values. The determination that there is a speculative bubble is therefore contingent on the availability of reliable price data and a model to determine intrinsic values.

There are no official and reliable statistics in Lebanon to allow for such an objective determination. While GDP numbers  are widely available  - US$13,200 (2009 est.) -, there is no reliable real estate price index. There is also no current survey of quality of housing in Lebanon, which could be used to determine intrinsic values for houses. The lack of reliable data shows up in discussions of house prices in the Lebanese press, where in the same article different price increases are cited.

Thus, discussion of the "Lebanese housing bubble" relies on subjective evaluations of the evolution of observed real estate prices relative to their intrinsic values.

In addition, there is no reliable data to estimate the average income of the Lebanese working abroad, complicating the analysis of likely reasons for a possible housing bubble.

References

External links 
 The Lebanese Real Estate Sector is Heading Towards the Crisis Cliff

Economy of Lebanon
Real estate bubbles
Real estate bubbles of the 2000s